The McArthur Basin is a large intracratonic sedimentary basin in northern Australia, with an exposed area of about 180,000 km2. Most of it lies within the northeastern Northern Territory, but extends over the border into the state of Queensland. The basin contains thick (locally up to 12 km) marine and non-marine sedimentary rocks which were deposited from the late Paleoproterozoic to the early Mesoproterozoic (1800-1430 Ma). The basin also contains some volcanic rocks and related intrusive igneous rocks. The McArthur Basin hosts the world-class McArthur River mine (HYC) zinc-lead-silver deposit (not to be confused with McArthur River mine in Canada) and several smaller mineral and diamond deposits.

References
 Rawlings DJ (1999). Stratigraphic resolution of a multiphase intracratonic basin system: the McArthur Basin, northern Australia. Australian Journal of Earth Sciences 46, 703–723. Abstract
 Scott DL, Rawlings DJ, Page RW, Tarlowski CZ, Idnum M, Jackson MJ, Southgate PN (2000). Basement framework and geodynamic evolution of the Palaeoproterozoic superbasins of north-central Australia: an integrated review of geochemical, geochronological and geophysical data. Australian Journal of Earth Sciences 47, 341–380. Abstract

External links
 McArthur Basin geology summary at Northern Territory Geological Survey

Sedimentary basins of Australia
Geology of the Northern Territory
Geology of Queensland
Proterozoic geology